Yang Side (11 December 1921 – 7 September 2018) was a Chinese major general of the People's Liberation Army, and served as Minister of the Taiwan Affairs Office of the CPC Central Committee.

Republican era
Yang Side was born on 11 December 1921 in Tengzhou, Shandong Province, to a peasant family. In 1938, he joined the Eighth Route Army, and subsequently in the same year, joined the Communist Party of China.

During the Second Sino-Japanese War, Yang held a number of positions including military chief of Shandong's Political Department and deputy minister of the Shandong Military Liaison Department. During the Eighth Route Army's Lunan Anti-Japanese campaign, Yang was responsible for contact with the Railway Guerrillas. He took part in battles such as the Laiwu Campaign and the Huaihai Campaign. During the battle of Nanjing in April 1949, Yang served in multiple positions including the political commissar of the Fourth Army's garrison in Nanjing.

People's Republic of China
After the founding of the People's Republic of China, Yang Side was involved in the formation of the People's Liberation Army Air Force, holding the post of a division political commissar. He participated in the Korean War. He later served as Vice Minister of the Liaison Department of the General Political Department, Minister of the Central Taiwan Affairs Office, member of the Standing Committee of the National Committee of the Chinese People's Political Consultative Conference, executive deputy director of the Macau, Taiwan and Hong Kong Liaison Committee, among other positions.

During the "Cultural Revolution", Yang Side was persecuted and imprisoned for five years. After China's reform and opening up, Yang was rehabilitated. In May 1986, a cargo plane of Taiwan's China Airlines, flown by the captain Xijue, landed at Guangzhou Baiyun Airport. Yang Side negotiated with the Taiwanese authorities in Hong Kong.

Personal life
Yang Side was married twice. In September 1949, he married the East China Field Army column art troupe captain Wang Chengming. During the Cultural Revolution, the couple were both persecuted. Yang Side published a memoir of the Cultural Revolution, entitled Historic Mission.

References 

 
 

1921 births
2018 deaths
People's Liberation Army generals from Shandong
Peking University alumni
Chinese Communist Party politicians from Shandong
Chinese military personnel of World War II